The Ethniki Etaireia ("National Society") was a secret Greek nationalistic organization created in November 1894, by a number of young nationalist officers, advocates of the Megali Idea. Its aim was to revive the morale of the country and prepare the liberation of Greek people still under the Ottoman Empire. 

In September 1895 they recruited civilians, all linked to the organization of the Olympic Games, including Demetrius Vikelas, although he claimed only to have given in to friendly pressure, playing a solely financial role and then quickly resigning from it.

The populism of the Ethniki Etaireia is considered to be responsible for the outbreak of the Greco-Turkish War of 1897. Following Greece's defeat, it was dissolved under the pressure of Prime Minister Georgios Theotokis.

See also

 Secret society

Notes

References
 Llewellyn Smith, Michael (2004). ''Olympics in Athens 1896: The Invention of the Modern Olympic Games.' Profile Books Limited. 

1890s in Greece
History of Greece (1863–1909)
Greek nationalism
Politics of Greece
Secret societies in Greece
Nationalist organizations
Greek revolutionary organizations
Revolutionary organizations against the Ottoman Empire
Megali Idea
1894 establishments in Greece